Vaclav Vaca (pronounced Vatslaf Vasa) (born 1948) is a Czech surrealist artist.

Biography

Childhood – 1948–1968
Vaclav Vaca was born in 1948 in Czechoslovakia (later the Czech Republic). From 1963 to 1968 he studied at the Prague Conservatory. Vaca began his artistic career as a ballet dancer and musician. When standing on a street corner performing with his troupe in Paris, he decided to leave for North America.

Canada and painting – 1969–present day
In 1969 Vaca moved to Canada and became a painter. He began to exhibit widely in Canada and the United States. He now lives and works in Toronto, Ontario. In 1982 he featured in a television documentary on CBC television entitled "Vaclav Vaca – Fantastic Visions". He now runs an interior design business.

Works
His works, which are surrealist, are all brightly coloured and dream-like. Some of his works incorporate religion such as "Gate to heaven" and "The cup".

Solo exhibitions
Since 1973, Vaca has had 15 solo exhibitions, with the most recent being in 2006.

Notes

References
 Interview at Review Magazine
 Biography at Sacred Catalog
 The Purple Pterodactyls, a book for which Vaclav Vaca illustrated the cover

External links

Czech painters
Czech male painters
1948 births
Living people